Samote Union Council is a union council in Punjab, Pakistan.

On 1 July 2004, Samote became the Union Council of Tehsil Kallar Syeda. Rawalpindi District was a Union Council of the Tehsil Kahuta.

Delimitation 2018
Samote Comes under Choha Khalsa Circle Union Councils Samote was under NA-50, National Assembly and PP-2, Punjab Assembly. After (Delimitation 2018) Samote Union Council came under NA-58NA-58, National Assembly and PP-7, Punjab Assembly.PP-7

Geography

Kallar Syeda, the capital city, is a main shopping centre for the people. The countryside surrounding the town is typical of Potohar Plateau landscape. It is surrounded by several smaller towns along with the main towns: Bewal, Choha Khalsa, Islampura Jabbar and Sir Suba Shah. The fertile land of the Union Council Samote region grows crops such as wheat, corn and peanuts.

People
The principal clans of Samote are the Malik Awan, Qureshis, Gakhar, Gujjars (chuhdri), Mughals, Sayyid, Rajputs (Jasyal Kanyals, Hashmis, Rajputs).

Economy 
Many residents own shops, while others are farmers. Many go abroad for a living, especially to the United Kingdom.

Sports 
Popular sports include kabaddi, volleyball, bull racing. Dog fighting is also popular.

Villages
Dhoke Baba Faiz Baksh
Balimah
Barota
Chamak
Dahan Gali
Dhamnoha
Hayal Pindora
Her Dho Chakyal
Kaaliyah
Khoyi Lass
Malook
Pind Mir Gala
Majhar
Morra Aadrian
PindoraHardo
Saaliyah
Sambel
Shah Khahi
Tanyam Syedan
Walayat Abad
Dhoke Bhatiyan

Education 
The area has many schools, including:

 Government Boyes Higher Scendery School Samote
 Government Girls Higher Secondary School Samote
 Government Boys High School Kaaliyah 
 Haqani Public School & College Samote
 Government Girls Primary School Sambe
 Government Primary School for Girls Walayat Abad
 Jammia Mohi Ul IslamSaddiqia Lilbanat Pandora
 Government Girls Primary School Chamak
 Government Girls Primary School Malook
 Government Primary School Dhoke baba Faiz Baksh
 Government Elementary School Dhaan Gali 
 Government Girls Primary School Dhamnoha
 Government Primary School Barota
 Globel School Pandora Hardo, UC Samote

Notable people Born in Samote Union Council

Dada Amir Haider Khan - Communist leader of undivided India and later Pakistan
 Sub Amanat Hussain - Ex Chairman Union Council Samote
 Ch Muhammad Akram - Ex Chairman Union Council Samote
 Ch Muhammad Khalid (late) - Ex MPA PP-7 Punjab Assembly Pakistan Peoples Party (1988-1997)
 Lt. Col (R) Muhammad Shabbir Awan, ex MPA PP2 Punjab Assembly Col Shabbir Awan joined PTI on 19 December 2013

Attractions

 Jhelum River  
 Dhan Gali Bridge

See also 
 Awans of Pakistan
 Gangal Awan

References

External links
 
 
 Tehsil Kallar Syedian
 

Union councils of Kallar Syedan Tehsil
Populated places in Kallar Syedan Tehsil